Xenylla is a genus of springtails and allies in the family Hypogastruridae. There are at least 120 described species in Xenylla.

See also
 List of Xenylla species

References

Further reading

External links

 

Poduromorpha
Springtail genera